Tora, Burkina Faso is a village in the Nassere Department of Bam Province in northern Burkina Faso. It has a population of 549.

References

Populated places in the Centre-Nord Region
Bam Province